Minh Long is a district (huyện) of Quảng Ngãi province in the South Central Coast region of Vietnam.

As of 2003 the district had a population of 14,634. The district covers an area of 216 km². The district capital lies at Long Hiệp.

References

Districts of Quảng Ngãi province